Sheep Island or Picnic Island is one of the San Juan Islands in San Juan County, Washington, in the United States. It is a tiny island lying just off the eastern shore of West Sound, Orcas Island.

The 2000 Census reported a permanent population of two persons on the island.

References
Sheep island: Block 2082, Census Tract 9601, San Juan County, Washington United States Census Bureau

San Juan Islands